Butler's Hill is a tram stop on the Nottingham Express Transit network, serving the suburb of Butler's Hill, Ashfield in Nottinghamshire, England.

The station is situated on the long single line section between Bulwell and Hucknall, which runs alongside the Robin Hood Line. Like all the other intermediate stops on this section, the stop has a passing loop with an island platform situated between the two tracks of the loop.

With the opening of NET's phase two, Butler's Hill is now on NET line 1, which runs from Hucknall through the city centre to Beeston and Chilwell. Trams run at frequencies that vary between four and eight trams per hour, depending on the day and time of day.

The Robin Hood line that passes alongside the stop was originally the former Midland Railway route from Nottingham to Worksop, but there has never been a railway station at the stop's location.

References

External links

Nottingham Express Transit stops
Railway stations in Great Britain opened in 2004
Transport in Ashfield District